Melaleucia tertia is a moth of the family Erebidae first described by Michael Fibiger in 2008. It is known from south-central Sri Lanka.

There are probably multiple generations per year, with adults recorded in July, August and September.

The wingspan is about 12 mm. The forewing is broad and white, although there is a terminal line in some specimens marked by black interveinal dots. The hindwing is light greyish brown, with an indistinct discal spot.

References

Micronoctuini
Moths described in 2008
Taxa named by Michael Fibiger